Syzygium apodophyllum is a tree in the Myrtaceae family endemic to north Queensland. The fruit is edible. It is a host for the exotic plant-pathogen fungus Austropuccinia psidii, which is causing a lot of damage to vegetation communities and economic plants.

Description
The tree grows some 1 to 6m tall, sometimes up to 20m.
The trunk is rarely more than 30 cm dbh, the bark is pale brown. Branches tend to be of a weeping habit. Leaves have short petioles, some 0.1-02cm in length, the twigs with leaves have 4 wings, with pairs of wings fused above each pair of leaves, forming a pocket. These wings often obscure the petiole so that leaves appear sessile. The leaf blades are some 3.6-8 by 1.4-3cm in size. The midrib is depressed on the adaxial/upper surface. The fruit, which are the typically red/pink Syzygium fruit with a watery but crunchy flesh surrounding a solitary large seed, are some 13 by 9mm in size, and either hang solitary in bunches, either axillary or terminally. Seed is up to 9mm in size. Fruiting occurs from March to September.

The wood has a specific gravity of 0.80gcm3.

Phylogeny
This species is most closely related to Syzygium corynanthum, nestled in a slightly larger clade with Syzygium canicortex.

Distribution
The tree is endemic to Queensland, Australia, growing only in the Cape York Peninsula and Northeast (north of Townsville and south of Princess Charlotte Bay areas, from Tully to the McIlwraith Range.

Habitat, ecology
This species grows as an understory in well-developed rainforest, in a variety of sites, but tends to more abundant in mountain rainforest, altitudinal range is from near sea level to some 1500m.

The plant is one of the hosts of the exotic plant pathogen Austropuccinia psidii. This species is relatively tolerant of the fungus, but other taxa are severely impacted.

Vernacular names
The species is known as rex satinash in Australian English.

Uses
This plant is generally a small and not well-developed tree (i.e. it is not that straight in its growth, nor producing long sections). It is regarded as of no commercial value. The fruit is edible.

History
The eminent Australian Myrtaceae botanist, Bernard Hyland (born 1937), described the species in his 1983 article, A revision of Syzygium and allied genera (Myrtaceae) in Australia in the Australian Journal of Botany.

Further reading
Govaerts, R. (2003). World Checklist of Selected Plant Families Database in ACCESS: 1-216203. The Board of Trustees of the Royal Botanic Gardens, Kew.
Govaerts, R., Sobral, N., Ashton, P., Barrie, F., Holst, B.K., Landrum, L.L., Matsumoto, K., Fernanda Mazine, F., Nic Lughadha, E., Proença, C. & al. (2008). World Checklist of Myrtaceae: 1-455. Kew Publishing, Royal Botanic Gardens, Kew.

References

apodophyllum
Plants described in 1983
Taxa named by Ferdinand von Mueller